Saalfeld is a village and a quarter of the town of Mühlhausen in Thuringia, central Germany.

Geography 
Saalfeld lies on the edge of the Thuringian Basin, several kilometres (miles) north of the core town of Mühlhausen. The village is connected to the town and the surrounding area via the Landesstraße (state's road) 1016.

History 

The village was first mentioned in a document on 29 October 1273.
For centuries, it belonged to the sphere of influence of the Reichsstadt (imperial city) of Mühlhausen. In 1565, the (male) population of Saalfeld was 46.
In 1802, Saalfeld, together with Mühlhausen, fell to the Kingdom of Prussia, from 1807 to 1813 to the Kingdom of Westphalia (canton Dachrieden) created by Napoleon, and after the Congress of Vienna in 1816, it was assigned to the Landkreis Mühlhausen i. Th. in the Prussian Province of Saxony.
On 8 March 1994, Saalfeld was incorporated into the town of Mühlhausen.

Sights

References

External links 

Mühlhausen
Former municipalities in Thuringia